Like I Used To is the debut studio album by English singer-songwriter Lucy Rose. It was released on 24 September 2012 by Columbia Records. It reached number 13 in the UK Albums Chart in its first week of release.

Track listing

Charts

References

2012 albums
Lucy Rose albums
Columbia Records albums